Joe Davis West Jr. (born February 1, 1984) is a former gridiron football wide receiver. He was signed by the Dallas Cowboys as an undrafted free agent in 2008. He played college football at Texas-El Paso.

West has also been a member of the New Orleans Saints, Sacramento Mountain Lions, and St. Louis Rams.

Professional career

Pre-draft

Dallas Cowboys
After going undrafted in the 2008 NFL Draft, West was signed by the Dallas Cowboys as an undrafted free agent. He was waived on June 19.

New Orleans Saints
West was signed by the New Orleans Saints, only to be waived during final cuts on August 30, 2008. He was subsequently re-signed to the team's practice squad.

California Redwoods
West was drafted by the California Redwoods of the United Football League in the UFL Premiere Season Draft in 2009. He signed with the team on August 18.

Calgary Stampeders
On May 7, 2012, West headed north to sign as a free agent with the Calgary Stampeders of the Canadian Football League.

Joe West caught his first CFL touchdown in the Stampeders' 17–10 win over the Saskatchewan Roughriders on August 25, 2012. Calgary head coach John Hufnagel commented on West after the game: "He executed his assignments well. That's exactly what we got him for." West would finish his first season in the CFL with 24 catches for 353 yards and 2 touchdowns.

West would start in 6 regular season games in the 2013 season totaling 277 yards on 19 pass receptions, with 3 touchdowns. He also added 3 receptions for 101 yards and a touchdown in the Western Final against Saskatchewan. Joe West missed 12 games of the season with a shoulder injury. On January 17, 2014, West signed a contract extension with the Calgary Stampeders.

References

External links
UTEP Miners bio
Calgary Stampeders bio 
Just Sports Stats

1984 births
Living people
People from Melbourne, Florida
Players of American football from Florida
American football wide receivers
Canadian football wide receivers
American players of Canadian football
UTEP Miners football players
Dallas Cowboys players
New Orleans Saints players
Sacramento Mountain Lions players
St. Louis Rams players
Calgary Stampeders players